Rophitinae is a subfamily of sweat bees in the family Halictidae. There are about 13 genera and more than 260 described species in Rophitinae.

Genera
These 13 genera belong to the subfamily Rophitinae:

 Ceblurgus Urban & Moure, 1993
 Conanthalictus Cockerell, 1901
 Dufourea Lepeletier, 1841
 Goeletapis Rozen, 1997
 Micralictoides Timberlake, 1939
 Morawitzella Popov, 1957
 Morawitzia Friese, 1902
 Penapis Michener, 1965
 Protodufourea Timberlake, 1955
 Rophites Spinola, 1808
 Sphecodosoma Crawford, 1907
 Systropha Illiger, 1806
 Xeralictus Cockerell, 1927

References

Further reading

External links

 

Halictidae
Articles created by Qbugbot